This is a list of cities and towns in Sudan. The population estimates are for 2006, last national census was of 1993.

List

Major cities

Alphabetical list

Abekr
Abyei
Al Fashir
Al Managil
Al Qadarif
Atbara
Babanusa
Berber
Buwaidhaa
Delgo
Dongola
Ad-Damazin
Ed Dueim
El Ait
El Gebir
En Nahud
El-Obeid
Er Rahad
Geneina
Hala'ib
`Iyāl Bakhīt
Kaduqli
Kassala
Kauda
Khartoum - Capital
Khartoum North or Bahri
Kusti or Kosti
 Merowe
Muglad
Nebelat el Hagana
New Halfa or Halfa Aljadeda
Nyala
Omdurman
Port Sudan or Bur Sudan
Rabak
Ruaba or Umm Rawaba
Sennar or Sannar
Shendi or Shandi
Sindscha
Singa
Suakin
Tabat or Al Shaikh Abdulmahmood
Taiyara
Tonj
Wad Banda
Wad Madani or Wad Medani
Wadi Halfa
Umm Badr
Umm Bel
Umm Dam
Umm Debbi
Umm Gafala
Umm Keddada
Umm Qantur
Um Rawaba
Umm Saiyala
Umm Shanqa

Almazmoum

See also 
Subdivisions of Sudan
List of cities in South Sudan
List of cities in East Africa
List of metropolitan areas in Africa
List of largest cities in the Arab world

References

External links 
Sudan Prayer Times List of 30021 cities and towns in Sudan, with decimal geographic coordinates

 
Sudan, List of cities in
Sudan
Cities
Sudan